Bruno Pucci (born July 23, 1990) is a Brazilian Jiu-Jitsu practitioner who holds a black belt and is best known for winning gold in the featherweight division at the 2009 and 2010 No Gi Grappling World Championships. In total, Pucci has secured podium finishes five times at the World Championship both with Gi and No Gi. He is also a mixed martial artist who is currently signed with ONE Championship.

Background

As a child Pucci had growth problems and needed hormone replacement because he was always short and weak. The treatment made him overweight and he wanted to take up a sport and chose Brazilian jiu-jitsu, eventually becoming a BJJ black belt under Sebastian Lalli at Checkmat in Brazil.

Mixed martial arts career

Early career

Pucci made his MMA debut on October 15, 2011 and submitted Raoni Tavares in the opening round at Adventure Fighters Tournament in Paraná. His next fight was on October 20, 2012, and he submitted Fernando Cabral in the opening round at Empire FC in Paraná.

In November 2012 Pucci moved to Singapore to join the fight team at Evolve MMA which included fellow Brazilians Rafael Dos Anjos and Leandro Issa.

ONE Championship

On June 10, 2013 it was announced that Pucci would be fighting Bashir Ahmad at ONE FC: Champions & Warriors. He won the fight via submission in the opening round.

On May 30, 2014, Pucci faced Major Overall at ONE FC: Honor and Glory, suffering his first loss by first-round knockout via punches and a soccer kick.

Pucci bounced back on December 11, 2015 at ONE Championship: Spirit of Champions with a submission win over Anthony Engelen.

On September 2, 2016, Pucci was knocked out in 8 seconds by Bahetihan Nuertiebieke at ONE Championship: Unbreakable Warriors. Unofficially, this is the second-fastest knockout in ONE Championship history.

On June 30, 2017, Bruno Pucci secured his first TKO victory against Jimmy Yabo at ONE Championship: Light of a Nation. 

On January 26, 2018, Pucci lost by first-round knockout to Emilio Urrutia at ONE Championship: Global Superheroes.

On November 17, 2018, Pucci submitted Xie Chao in under one minute at ONE Championship: Warrior's Dream.

Pucci picked up his second consecutive victory against former ONE Lightweight Champion Kotetsu Boku at ONE Championship: Eternal Glory on January 19, 2019. 

On November 22, 2019, Pucci made his bantamweight debut against Shuya Kamikubo at ONE Championship: Edge Of Greatness. He lost by unanimous decision.  

Pucci lost his next fight against Kwon Won Il by first-round knockout at ONE Championship: Inside the Matrix 4 on November 20, 2020.

Pucci faced Kirill Gorobets on November 19, 2022, at ONE 163. He lost the fight via unanimous decision.

Personal life
Pucci is married to fellow MMA fighter Angela Lee. Both Pucci and his wife are head coaches at United BJJ Hawaii, a gym that they founded in 2021. The opening of their gym was delayed by several days as the result of vandalism just prior to the date.

Mixed martial arts record

|-
|Loss
|align=center|7–6
|Kirill Gorobets 
|Decision (unanimous)
|ONE 163: Akimoto vs. Petchtanong
|
|align=center|3
|align=center|5:00
|Kallang, Singapore
|
|-
|Loss
|align=center| 7–5
|Kwon Won Il
|TKO (punches)
|ONE Championship: Inside the Matrix 4
||
|align=center| 1
|align=center| 2:00
|Kallang, Singapore 
|
|-
|Loss
|align=center| 7–4
|Shuya Kamikubo
|Decision (unanimous)
|ONE Championship: Edge Of Greatness
||
|align=center| 3
|align=center| 5:00
|Kallang, Singapore 
|
|-
|Win
|align=center| 7–3
|Kotetsu Boku
|Submission (rear-naked choke)
| ONE Championship: Eternal Glory
||
|align=center| 1
|align=center| 3:32
|Jakarta, Indonesia 
|
|-
|Win
|align=center| 6–3
|Xie Chao
|Submission (guillotine choke)
| ONE Championship: Warrior's Dream
||
|align=center| 1
|align=center| 0:56
|Jakarta, Indonesia
|
|-
|Loss
|align=center| 5–3
|Emilio Urrutia
|KO (punch)
| ONE Championship: Global Superheroes
||
|align=center| 1
|align=center| 3:33
|Manila, Philippines 
|
|-
|Win
|align=center| 5–2
|Jimmy Yabo
|TKO (punches)
| ONE Championship: Light of a Nation
||
|align=center| 1
|align=center| 2:12
|Yangon, Myanmar
|
|-
|Loss
|align=center| 4–2
|Bahetihan Nuertiebieke
|KO (punch)
|ONE Championship: Unbreakable Warriors
|
|align=center| 1
|align=center| 0:08
|Kuala Lumpur, Malaysia
|
|-
|Win
|align=center| 4–1
|Anthony Engelen
|Submission (rear-naked choke)
|ONE Championship: Spirit of Champions
|
|align=center| 2
|align=center| 2:19
|Manila, Philippines
|
|-
|Loss
|align=center| 3–1
|Major Overall
|KO (punches & soccer kick)
|ONE Fighting Championship: Honor and Glory
|
|align=center| 1
|align=center| 2:52
|Kallang, Singapore
| 
|-
|Win
|align=center| 3–0
|Bashir Ahmad
|Submission (rear-naked choke)
|ONE Fighting Championship: Champions and Warriors
|
|align=center| 1
|align=center| 3:13
|Jakarta, Indonesia
| 
|-
|Win
|align=center| 2–0
|Fernando Cabral
|Submission (rear-naked choke)
|Empire Promotions - Empire FC
|
|align=center|1
|align=center|3:08
|Parana, Brazil
|
|-
|Win
|align=center| 1–0
|Raoni Tavares
|Submission (rear-naked choke)
|AFT - Adventure Fighters Tournament
|
|align=center|2
|align=center|2:09
|Parana, Brazil
|

See also
List of current ONE fighters

References

External links

Living people
1990 births
Brazilian male mixed martial artists
Featherweight mixed martial artists
Mixed martial artists utilizing Muay Thai
Mixed martial artists utilizing Brazilian jiu-jitsu
Brazilian Muay Thai practitioners
Brazilian practitioners of Brazilian jiu-jitsu
People awarded a black belt in Brazilian jiu-jitsu
Sportspeople from Curitiba